is a district located in Saga Prefecture, Japan.

As of February 1, 2009, the district has an estimated population of 10,075 and a density of 136 persons per km2. The total area is 74.21 km2.

Municipalities
Tara, whose borders are effectively the same as Fujitsu District's.

History

1889-1963
1889-04-01 - The modern municipal system is established and Fujitsu District is formed with 14 villages. 
1912-12-01 - Minami-Kashima gains town status and is renamed Kashima town (鹿島町), and the village of Kita-Kashima is renamed Kashima village (鹿島村).
1918-08-03 - Hachihongi gains town status and is renamed Hama.
1918-10-05 - Shiota gains town status.
1929-04-22 - Nishi-Ureshino gains town status and is renamed Ureshino.
1933-04-01 - Higashi-Ureshino is incorporated into Ureshino.
1953-04-01 - Tara gains town status.
1954-04-01 - The town of Kashima, the village of Kashima, Hama, Furueda, and Nogomi all merge to form the city of Kashima, which then withdraws from the district.
1955-02-11 - Ōura is incorporated into Tara and changes the kanji of its name.
1955-03-01 - Nanaura is incorporated into Tara and Kashima.
1955-04-01 - Yoshida is incorporated into Ureshino.
1956-09-01 - Gochōda and Kuma are incorporated into Shiota.
1963-04-01 - Part of Shiota is incorporated into Ureshino.

Post-1963
2006-01-01 - Shiota and Ureshino merge to form the city of Ureshino, which then withdraws from the district.

Districts in Saga Prefecture